The Asia Masters Athletics Championships are the biannual championship of Asia Masters Athletics (AMA), one of six continental based regional affiliates of World Masters Athletics (WMA), known as the World Association of Veteran Athletes (WAVA) from its formation in 1977 until 2001.  WMA is the global governing body for the division of Masters athletics.  It is held in opposite years from the World Masters Athletics Championships.   The event also hosts the Asia Masters General Assembly, the political gathering of the AMA which selects the locations of subsequent championships.

Chinese Taipei was selected to hold the 2012 championships.  This is significant because China was a member of AMA at the time.  Taiwan had hosted the championships previously but since China joined AMA, it had blocked bids on the island.  This could be a softening of the difficult relations between the two capitols which both have claimed each other's territories since 1949.

The next championships will be held in Sarawak, Malaysia, December 2–6, 2019.

Championships

19th Asia Masters Athletics Championships 2016  Medal Table 

http://www.singaporeathletics.org.sg/amac2016/?frontpagetab=4

20th Asia Masters Athletics Championships 2017  Medal Table 

http://www.amac2017.cn/Category_131/Index.aspx

References

Asian Championships
Continental athletics championships
Recurring sporting events established in 1981
Biennial athletics competitions
1981 establishments in Asia